is a railway station located in Ōita, Ōita Prefecture, Japan, operated by Kyushu Railway Company (JR Kyushu).

The station opened on November 1, 1911. It has since undergone renovation, reopening in 2012 — the 'main' area of the station is now the southern, rather than the northern, entrance.

Lines
 Nippō Main Line
 Kyudai Main Line
 Hohi Main Line

Limited Express Trains
 Sonic ( - Ōita)
 Nichirin (Hakata - )
 Yufuin-no-mori, Yufu (Hakata - )
 Trans-Kyushu Limited Express (Beppu - )

Layout
There are four side platforms and eight island platforms.

The station was under construction to make it elevated. This work was to be finished by 2008 but fell behind schedule. It was completed on March 17, 2012.

History
On 15 December 1923, this entire stretch of track was redesignated as the Nippo Main Line.

On 1 December 1922, the Daito Railway was nationalized and JGR designated this stretch of track as the Daito Line.

With the privatization of Japanese National Railways (JNR), the successor of JGR, on 1 April 1987, Ōita came under the control of JR Kyushu.

Passenger statistics
In fiscal 2016, the station was used by an average of 19,165 passengers daily (boarding passengers only), and it ranked 4th among the busiest stations of JR Kyushu.

The station in media
The JR Ōita City station complex was the main subject of an episode in the NHK World English documentary series Japan Railway Journal. The episode was titled JR Ōita City: The Station Complex that Changed the Game and was first broadcast on 15 February 2018. The episode describes how the station complex, which opened in 2015, contributed to increased ridership at the station and also to the economic revitalization of the surrounding area. The same episode also covered the Bungo-Mori Roundhouse Park, located near Bungo-Mori Station.

Environs

North Entrance
Oita Prefectural Government Office
Oita City Hall
Oasis Hiroba 21 and Oita ANA Hotel OASIS Tower
Funai Castle
Building of Red Brick (Oita Bank)
Oita Chūō Post Office
Oita Parco and Oita Daiichi Hotel
Tokiwa Department Store
Chūōcho Centporta
Galleria Takemachi
Funai 5 Bangai
Oita Washington Hotel Plaza
Hotel Hokke Club Oita
National Route 10
National Route 197 (Chūō-dori main street)
Oita Station Bus Terminal
South Entrance
Oita City Museum of Fine Art
National Route 210
Oita Toyo Hotel

References

External links

  

Railway stations in Ōita Prefecture
Railway stations in Japan opened in 1911
Stations of Kyushu Railway Company
Ōita (city)